John Hempsey (1889 – 2 August 1938) was a Scottish footballer who played as a goalkeeper for Rangers, Morton and Kilmarnock.

Hempsey began his career at Port Glasgow Athletic (no official appearances registered) before moving to Morton in 1911. He joined Rangers a year later and would make 167 appearances in all competitions during his eight-year spell, winning the Scottish Football League title in 1912–13 after replacing the injured Herbert Lock. Rivals Celtic thereafter dominated the league during the World War I period, but Hempsey did pick up four winner's medals from the Glasgow Cup (also serving two short loan spells at Morton and Kilmarnock) before Lock took over as the regular again in 1919–20. Hempsey joined King's Park, then playing in the Central Football League, for a year and returned to Greenock for a final season (serving as back-up to Dave Edwards) before retiring.

References

External links
Details of Rangers career

1938 deaths
1889 births
Footballers from Greenock
Scottish footballers
Kilmarnock F.C. players
Rangers F.C. players
Greenock Morton F.C. players
Association football goalkeepers
Scottish Football League players
King's Park F.C. players